The Secretary of Corrections and Rehabilitation of Puerto Rico is responsible for structuring, developing, and coordinating the public policies of Puerto Rico over its correctional system and the rehabilitation of its adult and young population.

Former secretaries
 Mercedes Otero (1985-1992) 
 Zoraida Buxó Santiago (1993-1995)
 Nydia Cotto Vives (1995-1997)
 Zoé Laboy (1997-2000)
 Miguel Pereira Castillo (2003-2008)
 Carlos Molina Rodríguez (2009-2011)
 Jesús González (2011-2012)
 José Negrón Fernández (2013-2015)
José Aponte Carro (2015)
Ángel Negrón (2015) 
José U. Zayas Cintrón (2016) 
Ramón Torres Cruz (2016) 
Einar Ramos López (2016)
Erik Y. Rolón Suárez (2016-2019)
Eduardo Rivera Juanatey (2019-2020) 
Ana I. Escobar Pabón (2021–present)

See also 
Crime in Puerto Rico
Puerto Rico Police

References

External links
 www.ac.gobierno.pr 

Council of Secretaries of Puerto Rico
Department of Corrections and Rehabilitation of Puerto Rico